100,000,000 (one hundred million) is the natural number following 99,999,999 and preceding 100,000,001.

In scientific notation, it is written as 108.

East Asian languages treat 100,000,000 as a counting unit, significant as the square of a myriad, also a counting unit. These languages do not have single words for a thousand to the second, third, fifth powers, etc.

100,000,000 is also the fourth power of 100 and also the square of 10000.

Selected 9-digit numbers (100,000,001–999,999,999)

100,000,001 to 199,999,999
 100,000,007 = smallest nine digit prime
 100,005,153 = smallest triangular number with 9 digits and the 14,142nd triangular number
 100,020,001 = 100012, palindromic square
 100,544,625 = 4653, the smallest 9-digit cube
 102,030,201 = 101012, palindromic square
 102,334,155 = Fibonacci number
 102,400,000 = 405
 104,060,401 = 102012 = 1014, palindromic square
 105,413,504 = 147
 107,890,609 = Wedderburn-Etherington number
 111,111,111 = repunit, square root of 12345678987654321
 111,111,113 = Chen prime, Sophie Germain prime, cousin prime.
 113,379,904 = 106482 = 4843 = 226
 115,856,201 = 415
 119,481,296 = logarithmic number
 121,242,121 = 110112, palindromic square
 123,454,321 = 111112, palindromic square
 123,456,789 = smallest zeroless base 10 pandigital number
 125,686,521 = 112112, palindromic square
 126,491,971 = Leonardo prime
 129,140,163 = 317
 129,145,076 = Leyland number
 129,644,790 = Catalan number
 130,691,232 = 425
 134,217,728 = 5123 = 89 = 227
 134,218,457 = Leyland number
 136,048,896 = 116642 = 1084
 139,854,276 = 118262, the smallest zeroless base 10 pandigital square
 142,547,559 = Motzkin number
 147,008,443 = 435
 148,035,889 = 121672 = 5293 = 236
 157,115,917 – number of parallelogram polyominoes with 24 cells.
 157,351,936 = 125442 = 1124
 164,916,224 = 445
 165,580,141 = Fibonacci number
 167,444,795 = cyclic number in base 6
 170,859,375 = 157
 177,264,449 = Leyland number
 179,424,673 = 10,000,000th prime number
 184,528,125 = 455
 188,378,402 = number of ways to partition {1,2,...,11} and then partition each cell (block) into subcells.
 190,899,322 = Bell number
 191,102,976 = 138242 = 5763 = 246
 192,622,052 = number of free 18-ominoes
 199,960,004 = number of surface-points of a tetrahedron with edge-length 9999

200,000,000 to 299,999,999
 200,000,002 = number of surface-points of a tetrahedron with edge-length 10000
 205,962,976 = 465
 210,295,326 = Fine number
 212,890,625 = 1-automorphic number
 214,358,881 = 146412 = 1214 = 118
 222,222,222 = repdigit
 222,222,227 = safe prime
 223,092,870 = the product of the first nine prime numbers, thus the ninth primorial
 225,058,681 = Pell number
 225,331,713 = self-descriptive number in base 9
 229,345,007 = 475
 232,792,560 = superior highly composite number; colossally abundant number; the smallest number divisible by all the numbers 1 through 22
 244,140,625 = 156252 = 1253 = 256 = 512
 244,389,457 = Leyland number
 244,330,711 = n such that n | (3n + 5)
 253,450,711 = Wedderburn-Etherington prime
 254,803,968 = 485
 267,914,296 = Fibonacci number
 268,435,456 = 163842 = 1284 = 167 = 414 = 228
 268,436,240 = Leyland number
 268,473,872 = Leyland number
 272,400,600 = the number of terms of the harmonic series required to pass 20
 275,305,224 = the number of magic squares of order 5, excluding rotations and reflections
 282,475,249 = 168072 = 495 = 710
 292,475,249 = Leyland number

300,000,000 to 399,999,999
 308,915,776 = 175762 = 6763 = 266
 312,500,000 = 505
 321,534,781 = Markov prime
 331,160,281 = Leonardo prime
 333,333,333 = repdigit
 345,025,251 = 515
 362,802,072 – number of parallelogram polyominoes with 25 cells.
 364,568,617 = Leyland number
 365,496,202 = n such that n | (3n + 5)
 367,567,200 = colossally abundant number, superior highly composite number
 380,204,032 = 525
 381,654,729 = the only polydivisible number that is also a zeroless pandigital number
 387,420,489 = 196832 = 7293 = 276 = 99 = 318 and in tetration notation 29
 387,426,321 = Leyland number

400,000,000 to 499,999,999
 400,080,004 = 200022, palindromic square
 400,763,223 = Motzkin number
 404,090,404 = 201022, palindromic square
 405,071,317 = 11 + 22 + 33 + 44 + 55 + 66 + 77 + 88 + 99
 410,338,673 = 177
 418,195,493 = 535
 429,981,696 = 207362 = 1444 = 128 = 100,000,00012 AKA a gross-great-great-gross (10012 great-great-grosses)
 433,494,437 = Fibonacci prime, Markov prime
 442,386,619 = alternating factorial
 444,101,658 = number of (unordered, unlabeled) rooted trimmed trees with 27 nodes
 444,444,444 = repdigit
 455,052,511 = number of primes under 1010
 459,165,024 = 545
 467,871,369 = number of triangle-free graphs on 14 vertices
 477,638,700 = Catalan number
 479,001,599 = factorial prime
 479,001,600 = 12!
 481,890,304 = 219522 = 7843 = 286
 499,999,751 = Sophie Germain prime

500,000,000 to 599,999,999
 503,284,375 = 555
 522,808,225 = 228652, palindromic square
 535,828,591 = Leonardo prime
 536,870,911 = third composite Mersenne number with a prime exponent
 536,870,912 = 229
 536,871,753 = Leyland number
 542,474,231 = k such that the sum of the squares of the first k primes is divisible by k.
 543,339,720 = Pell number
 550,731,776 = 565
 554,999,445 = a Kaprekar constant for digit length 9 in base 10
 555,555,555 = repdigit
 574,304,985 = 19 + 29 + 39 + 49 + 59 + 69 + 79 + 89 + 99
 575,023,344 = 14-th derivative of xx at x=1
 594,823,321 = 243892 = 8413 = 296
 596,572,387 = Wedderburn-Etherington prime

600,000,000 to 699,999,999
 601,692,057 = 575
 612,220,032 = 187
 617,323,716 = 248462, palindromic square
 644,972,544 = 8643, 3-smooth number
 656,356,768 = 585
 666,666,666 = repdigit
 670,617,279 = highest stopping time integer under 109 for the Collatz conjecture

700,000,000 to 799,999,999
 701,408,733 = Fibonacci number
 714,924,299 = 595
 715,827,883 = Wagstaff prime, Jacobsthal prime
 729,000,000 = 270002 = 9003 = 306
 742,624,232 = number of free 19-ominoes
 774,840,978 = Leyland number
 777,600,000 = 605
 777,777,777 = repdigit
 778,483,932 = Fine number
 780,291,637 = Markov prime
 787,109,376 = 1-automorphic number

800,000,000 to 899,999,999
 801,765,089 = 9293
 804,357,000 = 9303
 806,954,491 = 9313
 809,557,568 = 9323
 812,166,237 = 9333
 814,780,504 = 9343
 815,730,721 = 138
 815,730,721 = 1694
 817,400,375 = 9353
 820,025,856 = 9363
 822,656,953 = 9373
 825,293,672 = 9383
 827,936,019 = 9393
 830,584,000 = 9403
 833,237,621 = 9413
 835,210,000 = 1704
 835,896,888 = 9423
 837,759,792 – number of parallelogram polyominoes with 26 cells.
 838,561,807 = 9433
 841,232,384 = 9443
 843,908,625 = 9453
 844,596,301 = 615
 846,590,536 = 9463
 849,278,123 = 9473
 851,971,392 = 9483
 854,670,349 = 9493
 855,036,081 = 1714
 857,375,000 = 9503
 860,085,351 = 9513
 862,801,408 = 9523
 865,523,177 = 9533
 868,250,664 = 9543
 870,983,875 = 9553
 873,722,816 = 9563
 875,213,056 = 1724
 876,467,493 = 9573
 879,217,912 = 9583
 881,974,079 = 9593
 884,736,000 = 9603
 887,503,681 = 316
 887,503,681 = 9613
 888,888,888 – repdigit
 890,277,128 = 9623
 893,056,347 = 9633
 893,554,688 = 2-automorphic number
 893,871,739 = 197
 895,745,041 = 1734

900,000,000 to 999,999,999
 906,150,257 = smallest counterexample to the Polya conjecture
 916,132,832 = 625
 923,187,456 = 303842, the largest zeroless pandigital square
 942,060,249 = 306932, palindromic square
 987,654,321 = largest zeroless pandigital number
 992,436,543 = 635
 997,002,999 = 9993, the largest 9-digit cube
 999,950,884 = 316222, the largest 9-digit square
 999,961,560 = highest triangular number with 9 digits and the 44,720th triangular number
 999,999,937 = largest 9-digit prime number
 999,999,999 = repdigit

References

Integers